Cenococcum is a genus of two species of fungi in the family Gloniaceae.

References

External links

Dothideomycetes genera
Mytilinidiales